The Scaled Composites Model 367 BiPod is an experimental flying car developed by Scaled Composites. It was the final aircraft designed by Burt Rutan prior to his retirement.

Development
The Bipod was originally designed to be an electric propulsion testbed, later evolving into the flying car concept. The vehicle was constructed for market evaluation and testing only. No flight testing was planned, or done, on the single prototype built.

Design
The BiPod uses twin fuselages with tandem wheels joined by a wing surface. The wings, stabilizers and tail tips are removable for road operations. The left cockpit is configured for road operations (i.e. it is driven as a car from the left-hand station), the right cockpit is configured for air operations (i.e. it is flown from the right-hand station). Thus the vehicle can be parked in a regular-sized garage stall when the wings and tail surfaces have been removed.

Propulsion
Each fuselage section has a 450cc gasoline engine, which drives an electric generator. The generators power 15 kW electric motors; two such motors drive the rear wheels for land use, and four such motors drive four propellers (two on the horizontal stabilizer and two on the wings). Although not installed to date as of July 2011, the testbed configuration will eventually incorporate rechargeable lithium batteries for additional power during takeoff or for extra climb performance.

Operational history
The prototype was built in four months. In July 2011, Aviation Week and Space Technology reported that "In anticipation of Rutan's retirement, Scaled Composite employees scrambled to get the new design flying in March of this year, only four months after its preliminary design phase." Test hops have been performed with the prototype at Mojave Air and Space Port using propulsion from the wheels. The vehicle has been ground tested up to 80 mph. No flight testing is planned.

Specifications

References

External links
 Scaled Composites BiPod page

Scaled Composites
Roadable aircraft
Hybrid vehicles
Twin-fuselage aircraft
Rutan aircraft
Twin-engined four-prop tractor aircraft
High-wing aircraft
Aircraft first flown in 2011